The Electronic Theatre Controls (ETC) Source Four (also known unofficially as Source 4 or S4) is an ellipsoidal reflector spotlight (ERS) used in stage lighting. First released in 1992, the Source Four was invented by David Cunningham and features an improved lamp and reflector compared to previous ERS designs, tool-free lamp adjustment, and a rotating, interchangeable shutter barrel. The Source Four is widely used by professional theaters across the globe.

Glass reflector

The Source Four uses a faceted borosilicate reflector behind the lamp.  Nearly all stage lights have some form of reflector positioned behind the lamp to reflect otherwise wasted light out of the front of the instrument.  The Source Four's reflector is dichroic, meaning that it reflects light of only certain wavelengths.  The Source Four's reflector reflects back 95% of the visible light striking it, while allowing over 90% of the infrared radiation (heat) to pass out the back of the instrument. This produces a much cooler light which is less destructive to gobos or color gels at the front of the fixture and reduces localized heating of the lighting target.

Lamp adjustment
Lamp adjustment, or bench focus, is used to achieve an even field of light, and to remove hot-spots which can destroy color filters.  On the Source Four, adjustment can be done without tools, and can be more accurate than older methods. The most common problem with lamp alignment is the lamp dropping too low in the reflector, causing a hot spot at the bottom of the beam, and a dark area at the top.  This may be corrected by a realignment of the lamp.

There are two adjustments that can be made to the cap.

1. The center screw controls the depth of the lamp into the reflector. Loosening this screw causes a spring to push the lamp further inside the reflector, creating a brighter hot spot in the beam. Tightening this screw will draw the lamp backwards, for a flatter, more even light field.

2. The wider nut that sits underneath the center screw moves the lamp's position horizontally and vertically. Loosening this nut will free the lamp assembly from the cap housing. The user can then push the entire adjustment screw and lamp along the plane to center the lamp in the reflector, evening the beam.

Lamps

HPL incandescent
The proprietary HPL (High Performance Lamp) lamp uses a compact filament, which concentrates the most light where it is efficient in an ellipsoidal reflector.  At 575 watts, HPL lamps can produce as much light as an older 1000 watt lamp. Source Four is named for the HPL, its light source, having four filaments. It is also available in 375 W and 750 W versions, at a variety of rated supply voltages. HPL lamps are also available in longer-life versions that reduce the color temperature from 3250 K to 3050 K to give the lamp a life of around 1500–2000 hours as opposed to the 300-400 hour life of the standard HPL.

Other versions
ETC also manufactures a high-intensity discharge (HID) Source Four body with a metal-halide lamp. The fixture has a small box attached to the yoke of the fixture which contains the ballast and other additional control gear required to strike and operate an HID lamp. HID lamps are not dimmable. The HID fixture uses less energy than the standard HPL lamp.

A range of Source Four instruments using LEDs are also available. The shutter, barrel, and lens tubes are identical to the HID and tungsten versions of the Source Four. Control of parameters such as color and light intensity is available via DMX. The power usage is approximately 25% of that of the equivalent tungsten version, although the purchase cost is significantly higher. Lamp life is significantly higher, retaining 70% of its original intensity at 50,000 hours.

Barrel

The Source Four is the first fixture to feature a rotating shutter barrel, which makes framing objects much easier regardless of lamp orientation. In previous fixtures, the shutters had only a limited range of motion and could not be rotated. The shutters are made from stainless steel, which does not warp as easily under the heat of the lamp. The shutters are arranged in 3 planes, allowing a degree of freedom in shutter placement by the extreme angles they can be racked to. The top and bottom shutters are on their own plane, with the 2 side shutters sharing a single plane.

ETC also offers a variety of interchangeable lens tubes with various field angles.  These are: 90, 70, 50, 36, 26, 19, 14, 10, and 5 degree lens tubes, some of which are available as enhanced definition lens tubes (EDLT).  The Source Four is also available as a zoom fixture, with a non-interchangeable lens tube. According to ETC's manual, the lenses in each lens tube cannot be reoriented, added or removed. Lenses come from the factory with a painted-on dot denoting the front face. The inside of the lens tube shows which slot is for which lens. The exception to this is the Source Four Zoom. The Source Four Zoom has a longer barrel, and it has a lens which changes the focal point by moving forward or backward.

Different field angles are needed for different venues with different catwalk and electric systems (and, therefore, different throws). A lens tube with a smaller field angle will light an area from far away, whereas a large beam degree such as a 90 degree can be much closer in order to light the same area. A 90 degree Source Four might be used to project a gobo from the rear only 5 feet away on a scrim at the back of the stage, while a 10 degree could be used in the back of the house, for example, in the technical booth where a technician could access it to refocus or change gobos during a show.  A zoom gives the option of adjusting the field angle within a specified range without changing the lens tube.  This is needed in the case of lighting fixtures that need to be re-focused frequently to different areas of the performing area, without having to rehang them in a different position in the lighting rig.  There are two Source Four Zoom fixtures, the 15-30 degree and the 25-50 degree.

Enhanced definition lens tube
In November 2005, ETC released the Enhanced Definition Lens Tube (EDLT).  The EDLT is designed to produce images from gobos and other focus-critical instrument accessories more clearly and accurately than with the standard lens barrels.  The lenses in the tube are coated with an anti-reflective material and are machined to more exact standards than the standard Source Four lens.  The EDLT also increases lumen output.  It is available in 19, 26, 36 and 50 degree barrels.

Third party offerings

Although the Source Four is designed to accept the same types of accessories as other lighting instruments, when launched in 1992 the smaller lens and barrel size required accessories that fit in a 6.25" holder rather than the 7.5" that was the standard for Lekos at the time.  Many third-party manufacturers have designed products specifically for the Source Four.

Ocean Thin Films, a manufacturer of scientific optics and instruments, offers the SeaChanger Color Engine that utilizes gradient dichroic disks to control color. The unit is mounted in between the lamp assembly and optics and is controlled via DMX512.

Great American Market (GAM) offers a special effects unit, the SX4, that is mounted inside a Source Four in a similar manner to the Seachanger Color Engine and offers a large selection of drop-in accessories that range from gobo-changers to overlapping looping gobos.  Several manufacturers of HMI sources, such as Kobold, provide lighting fixtures that provide "daylight balanced" light through the Source 4 without the use of gels.  This is accomplished by replacing the lamp assembly on the back of the Source 4 with an HMI lamp head.

Other Source Four products
In 1995, ETC introduced the Source Four PAR which is meant to replace traditional PAR cans. It uses the HPL lamp, and has interchangeable lenses.

In 1999, ETC introduced the Source Four PARNel as an alternative to Fresnel lanterns.

In 2002, ETC introduced the Source Four MultiPAR as an alternative to striplights.

In 2004, ETC introduced the Source Four Revolution, ETC's first moving fixture. The Revolution was awarded both the EDDY and ABTT awards. The Revolution has the same filament structure as famous HPL Source Four lamp, as opposed to most other moving lights, which use arc lamps, or, more recently, LEDs. Also, the Revolution uses a gel string color scroller instead of the typical color wheel, thus allowing lighting designers to use familiar gel choices.

In 2011, ETC introduced the Source Four Fresnel, which is a fresnel light that uses the HPL lamp.

References

Stage lighting instruments